Silvina Chediek (Buenos Aires, March 1, 1962) is an Argentine radio and television presenter.

She started in 1984 with the TV program "El Espejo", and has taken part in other TV and radio programs such as "Imagen de la Radio" (1986-1991),Reconocernos (1990-1995), Nunca es tarde (1992), Muestra gratis (1991), Confesiones al oído or Salud con Silvina (1996). From 2015, she is the conductor of "Lo mejor de ti".

References

External links 

1962 births
Living people
People from Buenos Aires
Argentine women journalists